Catherine McKinnell (born 8 June 1976) is a British Labour politician serving as Member of Parliament (MP) for Newcastle upon Tyne North since 2010.

Early life
McKinnell was born and raised in Denton, Newcastle upon Tyne, where she attended the Sacred Heart Catholic High School in Fenham. She studied politics and history at the University of Edinburgh.

Before her election to Parliament, McKinnell worked as an employment solicitor at Dickinson Dees, a Newcastle law firm.

Parliamentary career
McKinnell was first elected to Parliament at the 2010 general election for Newcastle upon Tyne North, one of 19 solicitors newly elected to the House of Commons. She was elected with 40.8% of the vote, and a majority of 3,414 over her Liberal Democrat rival.

In October 2010, the Labour Leader Ed Miliband appointed her to the role of Shadow Solicitor General, where she was responsible for the party's response to the News International phone hacking scandal. She raised questions about the Crown Prosecution Service's handling of the scandal, including a question to the Attorney General in the House of Commons asking why the CPS had refused for so long to admit that there were grounds to bring prosecutions.

In October 2011, during a shadow ministerial reshuffle, Catherine McKinnell was made shadow children's minister, shadowing Tim Loughton. In that post she criticised the adoption process as too slow and called for immediate improvements in support for social workers and family courts to speed up the process. She also accused the government of doing too little to help children for whom adoption was not suitable and following this, requested a guarantee that the government would give priority to placing children in "happy homes."

In 2012, after the resignation of Peter Hain, she was then moved to become Shadow Exchequer Secretary to the Treasury, replacing Owen Smith. McKinnell backed a campaign by ActionAid on international tax laws and tabled amendments to the Budget which would have required the government to monitor the impact on developing countries of changes to so-called Controlled Foreign Companies regulations. She said, "It seems a false economy to invest ... in changes that will undermine the very progress towards which our international aid money, which increases year on year, is going." In June 2012, McKinnell publicly criticised Take That singer Gary Barlow following newspaper allegations of tax avoidance made against him. McKinnell agreed that Barlow should consider returning his recently awarded OBE if allegations of tax avoidance were proven "because it doesn't send out the right messages to ordinary people who are paying their fair share of tax".

She was made Shadow Attorney General in September 2015 by Labour leader Jeremy Corbyn, but resigned in January 2016, citing party infighting, family reasons and the ability to speak in parliament beyond her legal portfolio. She supported Owen Smith in the failed attempt to replace Jeremy Corbyn in the 2016 Labour Party (UK) leadership election.

Mckinnell has been a prominent campaigner for the Women Against State Pension Inequality campaign, who, following the acceleration of the equalisation of the State Pension Age, have argued that the acceleration has happened too quickly and left female pensioners uncertain. Mckinnell was also made Vice Chair of the recently established All-Party Parliamentary Group on the WASPI campaign.

In September 2020, McKinnell was appointed a vice-chair of Labour Friends of Israel.

References

External links

|-

|-

1976 births
Living people
Alumni of the University of Edinburgh
British solicitors
Female members of the Parliament of the United Kingdom for English constituencies
Labour Party (UK) MPs for English constituencies
UK MPs 2010–2015
UK MPs 2015–2017
UK MPs 2017–2019
21st-century British women politicians
UK MPs 2019–present
21st-century English women
21st-century English people